Meroscelisus is a genus of beetles in the family Cerambycidae, containing the following species:

 Meroscelisus apicalis White, 1853
 Meroscelisus opacus Buquet, 1860
 Meroscelisus servillei Thomson, 1865
 Meroscelisus thoracicus Seabra, 1942
 Meroscelisus violaceus Audinet-Serville, 1832
 Meroscelisus zikani Melzer, 1919

References

Prioninae